Henry 'Gillie' Box (14 July 1916 – 26 January 1961) was an Australian rugby league footballer who played in the 1930s and 1940s.

Henry Box was known as 'Gillie'. He began his career in 1939 at Newtown before enjoying a long career at the Balmain club. A smart Halfback/five-eighth, 'Gillie' Box finished his career in 1946, age 30.

Box died in Newtown, New South Wales on 26 January 1961.

References

1916 births
1961 deaths
Newtown Jets players
Balmain Tigers players
Rugby league halfbacks
Rugby league players from Sydney
Australian rugby league players